The LRT Kelana Jaya Line is a medium-capacity light rapid transit (LRT) line and the first fully automated and driverless rail system in the Klang Valley, Malaysia. It forms a part of the Klang Valley Integrated Transit System in and around Kuala Lumpur, Malaysia. Servicing 37 stations, the line has  of grade-separated tracks running mostly on underground and elevated guideways. Formerly known as the PUTRA LRT, it is operated as part of the RapidKL system by Rapid Rail, a subsidiary of Prasarana Malaysia. The line is named after its former terminus, the Kelana Jaya station.

The line is numbered 5 and coloured ruby on official transit maps.

History 
Construction began in 1994, about the same time as construction of the Ampang Line. The tunnels were constructed by Hazama Corporation and Hyundai Engineering & Construction. Operation commenced on 1 September 1998 between Subang Depot and Pasar Seni, with phase two, Pasar Seni to Terminal Putra, starting on 1 June 1999.

In 2002, the line carried its 150 millionth passenger, with an average of 160,000 passengers daily. Today, it carries over 250,000 passengers per day and over 350,000 per day during national events.

The line underwent a  extension with construction from early 2010 through to 2016.

The Kelana Jaya Line was known as PUTRA LRT, with "PUTRA" standing for Projek Usahasama Transit Ringan Automatik Sdn Bhd (Automatic Light Transit Joint Venture Project), until the company was taken over by its current owner Prasarana Malaysia.

Chronology 
15 February 1994 – Projek Usahasama Transit Ringan Automatik Sdn Bhd (PUTRA-LRT) is incorporated.
1 September 1998 – Section 1 from Subang Depot to Pasar Seni commences operations.
1 June 1999 – Section 2 from Pasar Seni to Terminal PUTRA (now known as Gombak) commences operations. The second section includes Malaysia's first underground railway.
26 April 2002 – Projek Usahasama Transit Ringan Automatik Sdn Bhd is wound up by the Kuala Lumpur High Court.
1 September 2002 – PUTRA-LRT comes under management of Syarikat Prasarana Negara (also known as Prasarana Malaysia) and renamed "Putraline" under the first phase of the restructuring of Kuala Lumpur's public transport system. Prasarana also takes over STAR-LRT and is renamed "Starline".
November 2004 – Operational aspects of the two lines are transferred to the new government-owned Rapid KL under the second phase of the restructuring process. Ownership of their assets remains with Prasarana.
July 2005 – Rebranding of the system from Putraline to the Kelana Jaya Line begins. Station signage is changed by 2006.
24 July 2006 – Failure of the back-up computer causes the line to stop functioning during the evening rush hour. Passengers are trapped in trains and some force open doors to get out.
29 August 2006 – The then-Malaysian Deputy Prime Minister Najib Abdul Razak announces that the line will be extended from Lembah Subang to Subang Jaya and USJ.
6 October 2006 – A "technical problem" causes a train to stall between Dato Keramat and Damai at 7am, causing a shut-down of the Masjid Jamek — Gombak LRT Station stretch. Normal service is restored by 5pm that day.
13 October 2006 – Prasarana signs an agreement with Bombardier HARTASUMA Consortium (BHC) for the purchase of 22 four-car sets with an option of an additional 13 train sets for RM1.2 billion. The new trains are targeted to be delivered by 2008.
12 December 2006 – An accident occurs during peak hour as a train was approaching Pasar Seni LRT station. The train stops abruptly as if it hit something. No casualties occur.
8 October 2007 – Prasarana purchases an additional 13 Advanced Rapid Transit (ART) MK II train sets (52 cars) for €71 million. Delivery is expected in 2010.
27 July 2009 – The then-Malaysian Prime Minister Najib Abdul Razak announces that 35 new four-car trains will be operational by the end of 2012.
15 September 2009 – Prasarana begins a 3-month public display of the proposed alignment of the extension (and the Sri Petaling Line extension) for feedback.
October 2009 – Test runs for the new four-car trains begin. Passengers are not allowed to board these trains.
30 December 2009 – Three four-car trains officially begin service, while the remaining 32 four-car trains are gradually introduced into service through April 2011.
24 December 2010 – Sri Rampai opens.
28 November 2011 – The Kelana Jaya and Ampang – Sri Petaling Lines are integrated with a single ticketing system.
2 December 2015 – New fare structure takes effect and the new 'Smart 7' Weekly and 'Smart 30' Monthly smart cards are announced.
14 April 2016 – It is confirmed that the Kelana Jaya Line extension will be fully operational on 30 June 2016.
30 June 2016 – The Kelana Jaya Line extension starts operations.
29 December 2016 – Prasarana launches the first new Bombardier Innovia Metro 300 trains, also known as KLAV.
October 2017 – All 14 KLAV trains enter service.

Line information 
{
  "type": "ExternalData",
  "service": "geoline",
  "ids": "Q248445",
  "properties": {
    "stroke": "#e0115f",
    "stroke-width": 6
  }
}

Stations 

The line runs from Putra Heights through Kelana Jaya to Gombak, serving the Subang Jaya and Petaling Jaya regions to the south; southwest and central Kuala Lumpur, and Kuala Lumpur City Centre to the centre; and low-density residential areas further north. At  in length, it is one of the longest fully automated driverless metro lines in the world.

The stations are given in a north–south direction, consists primarily of elevated stops and a handful of underground and at-grade stations. Of the 37 stations, 31 are elevated, Sri Rampai lies at ground level, and five stops (Masjid Jamek, Dang Wangi, Kampung Baru, KLCC, and Ampang Park) are underground.

The stations, like those of the Ampang and Sri Petaling Lines, are styled in several types of architectural designs. Elevated stations, in most parts, were constructed in four major styles with distinctive roof designs for specific portions of the line. KL Sentral station, added later, features a design more consistent with the Stesen Sentral station building. Underground stations, however, tend to feature unique concourse layout and vestibules, and feature floor-to-ceiling platform screen doors to prevent platform-to-track intrusions. 22 stations (including two terminal stations and the five subway stations) use a single island platform, while 15 others use two side platforms. Stations with island platforms allow easy interchange between north-bound and south-bound trains without requiring one to walk down or up to the concourse level. The island platform at Putra Heights terminal station is shared with the Sri Petaling Line trains bound for Sentul Timur, allowing cross-platform line interchange at the station.

The stations were built to support disabled passengers, with elevators and wheelchair lifts alongside escalators and stairways between the levels. They are able to achieve this with:
 Tracks that are non-ballasted, lessening rail and train movements
 Trains that have direct rubber suspension, lessening train body movements
 Trains that do not rapidly run through stations
 Stations that have straight platforms

The stations on the Kelana Jaya Line are the earliest rapid transit stations in the Klang Valley designed to provide a degree of accessibility for handicapped users. In contrast, handicapped-friendly facilities for the Ampang and Sri Petaling Lines were installed beginning in 2012.

The stations have closed-circuit security cameras for security purposes.

List of stations

Gallery of stations

Extensions 
On 29 August 2006, Malaysian Deputy Prime Minister Mohd Najib Abdul Razak announced that the western end would be extended to the suburbs of Subang Jaya (USJ and Putra Heights) to the south-west of Kuala Lumpur. The extension would be part of a RM10 billion plan to expand Kuala Lumpur's public transport network.

The expansion plan will also see the Sri Petaling Line extended to the suburbs of Puchong and the south-west of Kuala Lumpur. The plan also involved the construction of an entirely new line, tentatively called the Kota Damansara–Cheras line, running from Kota Damansara in the western portion of the city, to Cheras in the southeast of Kuala Lumpur.

As of August 2008, Syarikat Prasarana Negara was reportedly running land and engineering studies for the proposed extension.

In September 2009, Syarikat Prasarana Negara began displaying the alignment of the proposed extensions over a 3-month period for feedback. The Kelana Jaya extension would have 13 new stations over 17 km from Kelana Jaya to Putra Heights. Construction was expected to commence in early 2010.

In November 2010, Prasarana announced that it has awarded RM1.7 billion for first phase of the project. The winners include Trans Resource Corp Bhd for the Kelana Jaya Line extension. UEM Builders Bhd and Intria Bina Sdn Bhd were appointed as subcontractors for the fabrication and supply of segmental box girder jobs for the Kelana Jaya Line.

Construction works on the Kelana Jaya Line and the Sri Petaling Line extension project were targeted to accelerate at the end of March 2011, with commencement of structural works, subject to approval from state government and local authorities.

In 2014, completion of the extension was targeted for 2016. On 14 April 2016, Prasarana Malaysia confirmed in a media release that the Kelana line extension would be fully operating on 30 June 2016.

Rolling stock

2-car 1998 Innovia ART 200 

The rolling stock, in use since the opening of the line in 1998, consists of 35 Innovia ART 200 trains with related equipment and services supplied by the Bombardier Group and train electronics company Quester Tangent. They consist of two-electric multiple units, which serve as either a driving car or trailer car depending on the direction of travel. They are equipped with Linear Induction Motor (LIM) propulsion technology which allows for operation on tighter curves, with less noise and greatly reduced wheel and track wear. The plating in between the running rails is used for accelerating and decelerating the train; additionally, the reaction plate is semi-magnetised, which pulls the train along and helps it slow down.

The ART is completely automated and operates without drivers, stopping at stations for a limited amount of time. Nevertheless, manual override control panels are provided at each end of the trains for use in an event of an emergency. The technology is essentially identical to that of the Vancouver SkyTrain, which operates in very similar environments.

The interior of the ART, like its Ampang and Sri Petaling Lines' counterparts, consists of plastic seating aligned sideways towards the sides of the train, with one foldable seats for passengers at the end of the cars for wheelchair, and spacing in the middle for standing occupants. Since its launch in 1998, the ART rolling stock has remained relatively unchanged; only more holding straps have been added and the labeling has been modified from Putra-LRT to RapidKL. Some of the rolling stock has the majority of the seats removed for added passenger capacity during rush hours.

4-car 2009 Innovia ART 200 

On 13 October 2006, Syarikat Prasarana Negara signed an agreement with Bombardier HARTASUMA Consortium for the purchase of 88 Innovia ART 200 cars (22 train sets of 4-cars), with an option for another 13, for RM1.2 billion. The 22 train sets, initially targeted to be delivered from August 2008 onwards, would have four cars each, boosting the carrying capacity of the fleet by 1,500 people. On 8 October 2007, Syarikat Prasarana Negara exercised its option to purchase an additional 52 Innovia ART 200 cars (13 train sets of 4-cars) for €71 million, expected to be delivered in 2010.

Although the trains were expected to arrive in August 2008, the manufacturer delayed the delivery to November 2008. Rapid Rail said that the trains will only be usable by September 2009 after having sufficient rolling stocks, power line upgrades, and safety testing. Transport Minister Datuk Seri Ong Tee Keat said in Parliament that the new trains would begin operations by December 2009. However, in July 2009, Prime Minister Najib Tun Razak announced that the four-car trains will only be fully operational by the end of 2012.

On 30 December 2009, 3 of the 35 new four-car trains entered commercial service. In addition to increased capacity up to 950 passengers per trip, new features included seat belts for wheelchair-bound travelers, door alarm lights for hearing impaired, and more handles for standing commuters.

Innovia ART 200 Mid-Life Refurbishment 

In June 2012, several 2-car Innovia ART 200 trains underwent major refurbishment work done by from Hartasuma Consortium. Known as Mid-Life Refurbishments (MLR), these refurbishments include an updated livery, changes of the LED headlights and interior lights, and interior refurbishments such as newer seat design and the installation of additional infotainment systems. Facilities were also added, such as openable windows during emergencies. The first MLR set, TR08, entered service on 15 October 2014.

In 2017, another MLR project included two 2-car sets permanently coupled to form a 4-car set, known as the 'married train'. Interiors were similar to the previous MLR sets with added TV panels at each end of the sets, dynamic route map displays and walkable through gangways between the two sets. The first coupled train, TR87 (previously TR22 and TR27), entered service on 29 December 2017, with the remaining undergoing delivery in stages.

KLAV Innovia Metro 300 

Under the Kuala Lumpur Additional Vehicle programme, the new generation Bombardier Innovia Metro 300 started service in June 2016. Each driverless train features a new design for the end caps, a curved sidewall structure, and a larger, more spacious interior. All trains come in a four-car configuration with each car accommodating up to 220 passengers. Low energy consumption is achieved through a combination of lightweight aluminium car shells and a LIM propulsion system. Furthermore, the vehicle's regenerative braking enables the reuse of energy released during braking. The aisles and walk-through gangways are also wider when compared with the previous fleet. In addition, the trainsets are equipped with 16 cameras on board, infotainment LCD screens, dynamic route maps, better air-conditioning and bigger windows. With the new trains, the line could increase its capacity by 20 to 30 percent.

An additional 27 new trainsets are being delivered. As of August 2020, three have arrived with two of them under installation. They were delivered for the first time by air using an Antonov An-124, one of the largest cargo planes in existence. The rest of the fleet are to be delivered by ship. Since 27 June 2021, two trainsets labelled Sets 92 and 93 were spotted to be in service on the line.

Fleet details

The Kelana Jaya Line fleet consists of the following models:

The old RM10 banknote of the 1996 series featured an image of the 2-car Bombardier Innovia ART 200 Kelana Jaya Line train.

Below are listed the Bombardier Innovia ART 200 refurbished 2-car set or known as MLR (Mid-Life Refurbishment).

All trainsets data are as follows (updated December 2022):

Below are listed the original Bombardier Innovia ART 200 2-car set livery:

Below are listed the Innovia ART 200 4-car original set:

Below are listed the newer Innovia Metro 300 4-car set (also known as KLAV):

Below are the prototype of the four-car refurbished, combining two sets of two-cars together into one:

Accidents and incidents  
On 4 March 2018, a high-voltage power line broke and fell on the roof of the Kelana Jaya station, causing the roof to be blown off. Trains on both routes pass through the station while it is closed for repairs. The Kelana Jaya station reopened a few days later.

On 2 May 2022, a train braked suddenly in the tunnel between Dang Wangi and Kampung Baru while travelling towards Gombak at around 11:20 p.m. The train eventually continued towards KLCC, with passengers being asked to disembark. No injuries were reported.

In November 2022, a series of service disruptions caused by faulty automatic train control (ATC) device(s) forced trains to move slower and stop longer than usual, especially between Kelana Jaya and KLCC stations.

On 5 November 2022, a fault occurred between KLCC and Ampang Park stations. RapidKL resolved the problem by updating the software of the faulty ATC device, and train service resumed as usual on 6 November 2022. The problem resurfaced again between KLCC and Kelana Jaya stations on the evening of 7 November 2022. Stations between Damai and Lembah Subang were closed at night to resolve the ATC stability issues. However, the same problem recurred on the evening of 8 November 2022, leading to a 4-day suspension. Prasarana carried out the repairs, including finding the root cause of the problem. After the subsequent stability tests under the supervision of technical experts from Thales Group and Land Public Transport Agency, the Ampang Park-Kelana Jaya stretch re-opens on 14 November 2022, two days earlier than expected.

2021 underground collision 

On 24 May 2021, at 8:45 pm MYT, train number 181 and 240 collided with each other between the KLCC and Kampung Baru LRT stations. Both trains were traveling in opposite directions on the same track and collided head-on. One of the trains was under maintenance and was being driven manually on the wrong track, while the other was automatically driven from KLCC. A total of 213 people were on board the automated train. Preliminary reports indicated that no fewer than 166 people were injured, 47 of which were serious; no deaths were reported, but 64 people requiring hospitalization, with 6 in critical condition. The case is under investigation as of 25 May 2021. This is the only and most severe incident involving a collision between two trains to occur along the Kelana Jaya line since it first opened in 1999.

Ridership

Notes and references

Notes

References

External links 

 Land Public Transport Commission
 Prasarana Malaysia
 MY Rapid

1998 establishments in Malaysia
 
Railway lines opened in 1998